Edgar Pardee Earle White (November 17, 1929 – January 7, 2014) was an American sailor and Olympic champion. He competed at the 1952 Summer Olympics in Helsinki, where he won a gold medal in the 5.5 metre class with the boat Complex II, together with Britton Chance and Sumner White.

He was born in New York City, New York. Raised in Mantoloking, New Jersey together with his twin brother Sumner, he graduated from Harvard College.

References

External links

1929 births
2014 deaths
American male sailors (sport)
Sailors at the 1952 Summer Olympics – 5.5 Metre
Olympic gold medalists for the United States in sailing
Medalists at the 1952 Summer Olympics
Harvard College alumni
People from Mantoloking, New Jersey
Sportspeople from Ocean County, New Jersey